Jalmari Malmi (25 September 1893, Virolahti - 27 November 1943) was a Finnish farmer and politician. He was a member of the Parliament of Finland from 1921 to 1922, representing the Agrarian League.

References

1893 births
1943 deaths
People from Virolahti
People from Viipuri Province (Grand Duchy of Finland)
Centre Party (Finland) politicians
Members of the Parliament of Finland (1919–22)
Finnish farmers